al-Mazra'a ash-Sharqiya is a Palestinian town in the Ramallah and al-Bireh Governorate, located  northeast of Ramallah in the northern West Bank. According to the Palestinian Central Bureau of Statistics (PCBS), the town had a population of approximately 4,495 inhabitants in 2007.

Geographic location
It sits at about 937 meters above sea level.

History 
Al-Mazra'a ash-Sharqiya has been identified as the Crusader village named Mezera, and the possible site of a Crusader church. In 1112, Arnulf, the Latin Patriarch of Jerusalem granted the tithes of Mezera to the abbey of St Mary. In 1154 Mezera was mentioned in Crusader texts together with Tarphin. In 1183  Patriarch Heraclius of Jerusalem settled a dispute regarding the tithes of the village.

Ottoman era
The population was 29 households, all Muslim. They paid a fixed tax rate of 33.3% on agricultural products, which included wheat, barley, olive trees, vineyards and fruit trees, occasional revenues, goats and beehives; a total of 3,500 akçe.

In 1838 el-Mezra'ah was noted as a Muslim village, part of Beni Murrah district, located north of Jerusalem.

An Ottoman village list of about 1870 showed that “el-Mezraa” had 177 houses and a population of 641, though the population count included men, only. It also noted that it is located south of Turmus Ayya.

In 1882, the PEF's Survey of Western Palestine described Al-Mazra'a ash-Sharqiya as: "A large village on a hill-top, the hill-sides covered with vineyards; there are also olives and figs. The houses are of stone and adobe."

In 1896 the population of Mezraa, located in the Beni Murra region, was estimated to be about 801 persons.

British Mandate era
In the 1922 census of Palestine, conducted by the British Mandate authorities, al-Mazra'a ash-Sharqiya had a population of 824 Muslims,  increasing  in the 1931 census to 1,191, still all Muslims, in a total of 247  houses.

In the 1945 statistics the population was 1,400 Muslim, while the total land area was 16,333 dunams, according to an official land and population survey. Of  this, 7,082  were allocated  for plantations and irrigable land, 3,831 for cereals, while 91 dunams were classified as built-up (urban) areas.

Jordanian era
In the wake of the 1948 Arab–Israeli War, and after the 1949 Armistice Agreements, Al-Mazra'a ash-Sharqiya  came under Jordanian rule. 

The Jordanian census of 1961 found 1,929 inhabitants here.

Post-1967
Since the Six-Day War in 1967, Al-Mazra'a ash-Sharqiya has been under Israeli occupation.

After the 1995 accords, 10.1% of village land was classified as Area A, 71% as Area B, the remaining 18.9% as Area C. The Israelis have confiscated village land for the construction of Israeli bypass roads, to various Israeli military bases.

The town's many enormous and elaborate mansions have led it to be called the "Miami of the West Bank", according to the BBC. The wealth is not from local sources, but from the Palestinian diaspora.

Footnotes

Bibliography

External links
Welcome To al-Mazra'a al-Sharqiya
Survey of Western Palestine, Map 14:  IAA, Wikimedia commons 
 Palestinians build luxury houses in the 'Miami of the West Bank 9 November 2012, BBC (video)
 Al Mazra’a ash Sharqiya Town (Fact Sheet),   Applied Research Institute–Jerusalem (ARIJ)
Al Mazra’a ash Sharqiya Town Profile, ARIJ
Al Mazra’a ash Sharqiya aerial photo, ARIJ
Locality Development Priorities and Needs in Al Mazra’a ash Sharqiya Town, ARIJ

Towns in the West Bank
Ramallah and al-Bireh Governorate
Throne villages
Municipalities of the State of Palestine